James Frawley (born 20 September 1988) is a former professional Australian rules footballer who played with the Melbourne Football Club, Hawthorn Football Club and St Kilda Football Club in the Australian Football League (AFL).

AFL career
While completing his final year at Damascus College Ballarat, Frawley was recruited from the North Ballarat Rebels in the TAC Cup following from his junior ranks at the East Ballarat Junior Football Netbal Club in the Ballarat Football Netball League. He was taken by the Melbourne Demons with their first round pick (12th overall) in the 2006 AFL Draft. He is the nephew of a former St Kilda captain, Danny Frawley.

Melbourne (2007–2014)

Frawley debuted for the Demons in Round 9, 2007 and played all of his games in defence. He played nine senior games in his first year of AFL football.

Not known for his kicking efficiency, Frawley had a tough and uncompromising defensive style of play.

The 2010 season was a breakout year for Frawley who, at still only 21 years of age, became one of the premier defenders in the league. His season was capped off by being named in the back pocket for the 2010 All-Australian squad and finishing second to Brad Green in Melbourne's Best and Fairest.

Coming off his breakthrough season in 2010, Frawley's 2011 season started with a setback as he was sidelined for up to three months after tearing his pectoral muscle in January.

In 2014, under the new coaching structure of Paul Roos, Frawley began to play more of a forward role. His defensive efforts inside Melbourne's forward 50 was a contributing factor towards their on-field improvement.

Hawthorn (2015–2020)
On 6 October 2014, Frawley exercised his rights as a free agent and joined the Hawthorn Football Club. He was to play under his eighth coach, three of which were caretaker coaches.

Frawley featured in the club's 2015 premiership winning team at the end of the season and played an instrumental role in the victory, keeping Coleman Medallist Josh Kennedy goalless for the entire match.

On 8 October 2020, Frawley retired from the AFL.

St Kilda (2021) 

Frawley backflipped on his retirement and joined St Kilda as a delisted free agent on 26 November 2020. He had announced his retirement from the Hawks at the end of 2020 but was lured out of retirement and was eligible for selection as a delisted free agent following the first list lodgement on 25 November. Frawley played in a practice match against North Melbourne in February. He also played in the Saints' Community Series win against Carlton, but suffered a hamstring injury in the first quarter and did see out the match. As a result of the injury, Frawley is expected to miss eight to ten weeks of the regular season. After two games for St Kilda, Frawley retired for the second time at the conclusion of the 2021 AFL season.

Statistics

|- style=background:#EAEAEA
| 2007 ||  || 8
| 9 || 0 || 0 || 35 || 32 || 67 || 21 || 15 || 0.0 || 0.0 || 3.9 || 3.6 || 7.4 || 2.3 || 1.7 || 0
|- 
| 2008 ||  || 8
| 11 || 0 || 0 || 66 || 38 || 104 || 44 || 21 || 0.0 || 0.0 || 6.0 || 3.5 || 9.5 || 4.0 || 1.9 || 0
|- style=background:#EAEAEA
| 2009 ||  || 8
| 20 || 1 || 1 || 154 || 124 || 278 || 89 || 38 || 0.1 || 0.1 || 7.7 || 6.2 || 13.9 || 4.5 || 1.9 || 0
|-
| 2010 ||  || 8
| 21 || 1 || 1 || 234 || 157 || 391 || 123 || 49 || 0.0 || 0.0 || 11.1 || 7.5 || 18.6 || 5.9 || 2.3 || 3
|- style=background:#EAEAEA
| 2011 ||  || 8
| 21 || 1 || 1 || 238 || 154 || 392 || 109 || 32 || 0.0 || 0.0 || 11.3 || 7.3 || 18.7 || 5.2 || 1.5 || 2
|-
| 2012 ||  || 8
| 19 || 0 || 1 || 215 || 80 || 295 || 96 || 45 || 0.0 || 0.1 || 11.3 || 4.2 || 15.5 || 5.1 || 2.4 || 0
|- style=background:#EAEAEA
| 2013 ||  || 8
| 17 || 0 || 1 || 165 || 86 || 251 || 97 || 34 || 0.0 || 0.1 || 9.7 || 5.1 || 14.8 || 5.7 || 2.0 || 0
|- 
| 2014 ||  || 8
| 21 || 15 || 16 || 219 || 101 || 320 || 156 || 46 || 0.7 || 0.8 || 10.4 || 4.8 || 15.2 || 7.4 || 2.2 || 3
|- style=background:#EAEAEA
| bgcolor=F0E68C | 2015# ||  || 12
| 18 || 6 || 1 || 148 || 84 || 232 || 88 || 32 || 0.3 || 0.1 || 8.2 || 4.7 || 12.9 || 4.9 || 1.7 || 0
|-
| 2016 ||  || 12
| 22 || 0 || 0 || 191 || 112 || 303 || 114 || 48 || 0.0 || 0.0 || 8.7 || 5.1 || 13.8 || 5.2 || 2.2 || 0
|- style=background:#EAEAEA
| 2017 ||  || 12
| 8 || 0 || 0 || 77 || 39 || 116 || 52 || 13 || 0.0 || 0.0 || 9.6 || 4.9 || 14.5 || 6.5 || 1.2 || 0
|-
| 2018 ||  || 12
| 20 || 0 || 0 || 185 || 86 || 271 || 91 || 30 || 0.0 || 0.0 || 9.3 || 4.3 || 13.6 || 4.6 || 1.5 || 0
|- style=background:#EAEAEA
| 2019 ||  || 12
| 18 || 0 || 0 || 157 || 61 || 218 || 77 || 27 || 0.0 || 0.0 || 8.7 || 3.4 || 12.1 || 4.3 || 1.5 || 1
|-
| 2020 ||  || 12
| 14 || 0 || 0 || 77 || 45 || 122 || 41 || 10 || 0.0 || 0.0 || 5.5 || 3.2 || 8.7 || 2.9 || 0.7 || 0
|- style=background:#EAEAEA
| 2021 ||  || 24
| 2 || 0 || 0 || 13 || 10 || 23 || 10 || 2 || 0.0 || 0.0 || 6.5 || 5.0 || 11.5 || 5.0 || 1.0 || 0
|- class="sortbottom"
! colspan=3| Career
! 241 !! 24 !! 22 !! 2174 !! 1209 !! 3383 !! 1208 !! 442 !! 0.1 !! 0.1 !! 9.0 !! 5.0 !! 14.0 !! 5.0 !! 1.8 || 9
|}

Notes

Honours and achievements
Team
 AFL premiership player: 2015
 Minor premiership: 2015

Individual
 All-Australian team: 2010
 2× Australian international rules football team: 2010, 2011

References

External links

DemonWiki player profile

Australian rules footballers from Victoria (Australia)
Melbourne Football Club players
Hawthorn Football Club players
Hawthorn Football Club Premiership players
Living people
1988 births
All-Australians (AFL)
Greater Western Victoria Rebels players
East Point Football Club players
Casey Demons players
Box Hill Football Club players
Australia international rules football team players
St Kilda Football Club players
One-time VFL/AFL Premiership players